Dillon Steuer  is an American professional racing driver. He last competed part-time in the NASCAR Camping World Truck Series driving the No. 20 Chevrolet Silverado for Young's Motorsports.

Racing career

Early career
Steuer, who comes from a racing family, started racing at age 10 after watching his father race at Riverhead Raceway in Long Island, New York. In 2016, Steuer's father retired in order to support his son's career.

Whelen Modified Tour
Steuer made his NASCAR Whelen Modified Tour debut in 2017 at the Riverhead Raceway, finishing 9th. He also ran at Thompson Speedway, finishing 22nd, and again at Riverhead, finishing 7th.

Camping World Truck Series
Steuer was announced to make his debut in the NASCAR Camping World Truck Series, running the No. 20 Chevrolet Silverado for Young's Motorsports in the 2022 Blue-Emu Maximum Pain Relief 200 at Martinsville Speedway. Steuer failed to finish the race, coming home in 32nd due to an accident.

Motorsports career results

NASCAR
(key) (Bold – Pole position awarded by qualifying time. Italics – Pole position earned by points standings or practice time. * – Most laps led.)

Camping World Truck Series

Whelen Modified Tour

 Season still in progress
 Ineligible for series points

References

External links
 

Living people
NASCAR drivers
2002 births
Racing drivers from New York (state)